Anna Fisher may refer to:

 Anna Lee Fisher (born 1949), American chemist and NASA astronaut
 Anna S. Fisher (1873–1942), American artist and teacher, from Cold Brook, New York
 Anna L. Fisher (active 1910s–1930s), American advisor to Faisal I of Iraq

See also
 Anna Fischer (born 1986), German actress and singer